La Ferté-Alais is a commune in the Essonne department in Île-de-France in northern France. It used to be a fortress closing the access to the French royal estate from the Essonne valley, then became an industrial village with sand and stones. Its airfield (actually in Cerny), hosts a world-famous air show for vintage World War I and WWII aircraft and a museum of such aircraft.

It even has the aircraft (still airworthy) that Louis Blériot used to cross the English Channel in 1909.

Inhabitants of La Ferté-Alais are known as Fertois.

Town name history
The town name was known under the name Firmitas, Firmitas Aalipdis, Firmitas Adelaidis, Ferte in 1091, Firmitas Balduini, la Ferté Baudouin in the 12th century from the name of its lord in the 11th century, Feritas, Firmitas Aidelaidis around 1200, apud Feritatem Alisie in 1266, la Ferté Aales around 1263. The name La Ferte-Aleps appears in the Cassini maps and the final name of the commune is registered during its creation in 1793. It is possible to find the name La Ferté-Alaix and afterwards La Ferté-Alais in the law bulletin in 1801. But the final name will remain from 1845 onwards.

See also
 La Ferté-Alais Air Show
 Communes of the Essonne department

References

External links

Official website 
Non-official website 

Mayors of Essonne Association 

Communes of Essonne